Mandageria fairfaxi (Pronunciation: Man-daj-ee-ree-a fair-fax-i) is an extinct lobe-finned fish that lived during the Late Devonian period (Frasnian – Famennian). It is related to the much larger Hyneria; although Mandageria was smaller, it probably hunted in the same way.

The generic epithet, Mandageria, refers to the Mandagery Sandstone, outcropping near Canowindra, Australia, where the fossils were found.  The specific epithet, fairfaxi, honors the philanthropist James Fairfax. M. fairfaxi is the state fossil emblem for New South Wales.

Description
It had a long torpedo-shaped body and large tail fins. Mandageria also had large pectoral fins which could have helped it manoeuvre around submerged logs when preparing to attack its prey. Mandageria had a functional neck joint, an otherwise uncommon feature among fish - Tiktaalik, Tarrasius, placoderms (esp. Arthrodira) and seahorses being other exceptions.

References

External links
 Mandageria at Palaeos
 Review of Mandageria
 The braincase and palate of Mandageria fairfaxi
 The fossil skull of Mandageria
 Reconstruction of Mandageria

Tristichopterids
Prehistoric lobe-finned fish genera
Devonian bony fish
Prehistoric fish of Australia